Tamboicus is a genus of harvestmen in the family Sclerosomatidae from South America.

Species
 Tamboicus fuhrmanni Roewer, 1912
 Tamboicus insularis (Canals, 1935)
 Tamboicus rufus Roewer, 1953

References

Harvestmen
Harvestman genera